Mikhaylovka is a rural locality (a village) in Krasnoyarsky Selsoviet, Sterlitamaksky District, Bashkortostan, Russia. The population was 6 as of 2010. There are 9 streets.

Geography 
Mikhaylovka is located 19 km north of Sterlitamak (the district's administrative centre) by road. Cherkassy is the nearest rural locality.

References 

Rural localities in Sterlitamaksky District